Midori Kinouchi (木之内 みどり, Kinouchi Midori, b. Midori Kiuchi on June 10, 1957) is a former Japanese idol and actress.

Biography 

In 1972 Midori Kinouchi was the runner up in the NTV program "Miss Teen Contest". She debuted as a singer in May, 1974 with the song "Mezame" (Wake Up), which was written by famous Japanese lyricist Yū Aku. She debuted as an actress in 1976 in the drama "Watashi Mo Moeiteru" and starred in the 1977 TV series "Keiji Inu Curl".

In early 1978 she scored her biggest hit with "Yokohama Eleven", which reached the Oricon top 30. That same year she announced her retirement because of her marriage to composer and arranger Tsugutoshi Gotō. They divorced 4 years later, and she subsequently married Naoto Takenaka in 1990.

See also 

 Kayōkyoku
 Japanese idol
 List of Japanese idols

References 

1957 births
Japanese women singers
Japanese idols
Japanese television actresses
Living people
20th-century Japanese actresses
20th-century Japanese women singers
20th-century Japanese singers